Aditya Captive Power Plant is a captive 900 megawatt power project located at Lapanga, Sambalpur District Odisha which is part of Hindalco's Smelter_power project in Odisha. It has captive coal from Talabira-2 coal block a JV between Mahanadi Coalfields and Neyveli Lignite Corporation.

Project
Hindalco Industries awarded contract to BHEL for main package in June 2009. It is 6x150MW project with first of its kind Turbo generators designed by BHEL specifically for this project.

Clearances
The project has been accorded environmental clearance by the Ministry of Environment, Forest and Climate Change (MoEF&CC).

Capacity
The planned capacity of the thermal power plant is 1350 MW. Phase I of 6x150MW units and Phase II of 5x150 MW units.

References 

Sambalpur district
Coal-fired power stations in Odisha
Government of Odisha
Hindalco Industries
2013 establishments in Odisha
Energy infrastructure completed in 2013